Miss Kerala 2019 was the 20th edition of the Miss Kerala beauty pageant. It was held at Le Méridien, Kochi on  12 December 2019. At the end of the event, Miss Kerala 2018, Pratibha Sai along with actor Shane Nigam crowned Ansi Kabeer as the winner.

On Monday, 1 November 2021, the winner, Ansi Kabeer and the 1st runner-up Anjana Shajan of the Miss Kerala 2019 pageant died in a car crash near Vyttila, Kochi, Kerala.

Format 
This year's Miss Kerala had three phases of digital auditioning, which included social media platforms. The use of social media platforms allowed more people from all around the state to participate in the pageant. The "Digital audition" was the first stage of the audition, in which contestants were given a task to complete and then submit it to their social media profiles with the pageant's logo. A judging panel assesses these tasks based on presentation, language competency, confidence, inventiveness, intelligence, and exterior grooming such as hair, makeup, and styling. At the end of each step, contestants are eliminated, and at the end of the first phase, a total of 100 contestants were shortlisted for the third phase. After the last round of auditions, 22 contestants from the Miss Kerala Top 100 were chosen as finalists.

Results

Sub Title Awards

Judges 
 Haripriya Namboodiri — Kathakali (a major form of classical Indian dance) artist
 Nikhil Prasad  — Founder of Karikku (Malayalam web-series)
 Paris Laxmi — Dancer and actress
 Prasanth Nair IAS — Kozhikode district collector
 Rajeev Nair — Writer, lyricist and producer in the Malayalam film industry
 Rohini Dinakar — Costume designer
 Sajna Najam — Choreographer
 Sapana Chawla

Contestants
The following are the 22 shortlisted delegates of Miss Kerala 2019:
Color key

Death of the titleholders 
In the early morning of Monday, November 1, 2021, the winner of Miss Kerala 2019 and the 1st runner-up were killed in a car crash on the Vyttila-Palarivattom Bypass in Kochi. Ansi Kabeer and Anjana Shajan died instantly after the car they were riding in lost control and crashed into a tree while attempting to dodge a vehicle on two wheels.

In Chakkaraparambu, the incident took place near the Holiday Inn hotel. Two other guys in the automobile were critically hurt and were sent to the Ernakulam Medical Center (EMC) in Palarivattom for treatment. Only minor injuries were sustained by the riders.

References

External links
 Miss Kerala Official Website

2019 beauty pageants
2019 in India
Beauty pageants in India
Kerala